The following is a partial list of the "E" codes for Medical Subject Headings (MeSH), as defined by the United States National Library of Medicine (NLM).

This list continues the information at List of MeSH codes (E03). Codes following these are found at List of MeSH codes (E05). For other MeSH codes, see List of MeSH codes.

The source for this content is the set of 2006 MeSH Trees from the NLM.

– surgical procedures, operative

– ambulatory surgical procedures

– anastomosis, surgical
  – anastomosis, roux-en-y
  – arteriovenous shunt, surgical
  – cerebrospinal fluid shunts
  – ventriculoperitoneal shunt
  – ventriculostomy
  – cholecystostomy
  – choledochostomy
  – endolymphatic shunt
  – gastroenterostomy
  – gastric bypass
  – heart bypass, right
  – fontan procedure
  – jejunoileal bypass
  – pancreaticojejunostomy
  – pericardial window techniques
  – peritoneovenous shunt
  – portasystemic shunt, surgical
  – portacaval shunt, surgical
  – portasystemic shunt, transjugular intrahepatic
  – splenorenal shunt, surgical
  – portoenterostomy, hepatic
  – salpingostomy
  – vasovasostomy

– assisted circulation
  – counterpulsation
  – intra-aortic balloon pumping
  – heart-assist devices

– bariatric surgery
  – gastric bypass
  – gastroplasty
  – jejunoileal bypass
  – lipectomy

– biopsy
  – biopsy, needle
  – biopsy, fine-needle
  – conization
  – sentinel lymph node biopsy

– body modification, non-therapeutic
  – body piercing
  – circumcision
  – circumcision, female
  – tattooing

– cardiovascular surgical procedures
  – cardiac surgical procedures
  – cardiomyoplasty
  – heart arrest, induced
  – circulatory arrest, deep hypothermia induced
  – heart bypass, right
  – fontan procedure
  – heart massage
  – heart transplantation
  – heart-lung transplantation
  – heart valve prosthesis implantation
  – myocardial revascularization
  – angioplasty, transluminal, percutaneous coronary
  – atherectomy, coronary
  – coronary artery bypass
  – coronary artery bypass, off-pump
  – internal mammary-coronary artery anastomosis
  – pericardial window techniques
  – pericardiectomy
  – pericardiocentesis
  – reperfusion
  – myocardial reperfusion
  – vascular surgical procedures
  – angioplasty
  – angioplasty, balloon
  – angioplasty, balloon, laser-assisted
  – angioplasty, transluminal, percutaneous coronary
  – angioplasty, laser
  – angioplasty, balloon, laser-assisted
  – atherectomy
  – atherectomy, coronary
  – angioscopy
  – arteriovenous shunt, surgical
  – blood vessel prosthesis implantation
  – cerebral revascularization
  – embolectomy
  – endarterectomy
  – endarterectomy, carotid
  – limb salvage
  – peritoneovenous shunt
  – portasystemic shunt, surgical
  – portacaval shunt, surgical
  – portasystemic shunt, transjugular intrahepatic
  – splenorenal shunt, surgical
  – thrombectomy
  – venous cutdown

– cryosurgery

– curettage
  – dilatation and curettage
  – vacuum curettage

– debridement

– decompression, surgical

– deep brain stimulation

– device removal

– digestive system surgical procedures
  – anastomosis, roux-en-y
  – appendectomy
  – biliary tract surgical procedures
  – biliopancreatic diversion
  – cholecystectomy
  – cholecystectomy, laparoscopic
  – cholecystostomy
  – choledochostomy
  – portoenterostomy, hepatic
  – sphincterotomy, endoscopic
  – sphincterotomy, transhepatic
  – biliopancreatic diversion
  – colectomy
  – proctocolectomy, restorative
  – endoscopy, digestive system
  – cholangiopancreatography, endoscopic retrograde
  – endoscopy, gastrointestinal
  – colonoscopy
  – sigmoidoscopy
  – duodenoscopy
  – gastroscopy
  – proctoscopy
  – sphincterotomy, endoscopic
  – esophagoscopy
  – enterostomy
  – cecostomy
  – colostomy
  – duodenostomy
  – ileostomy
  – jejunostomy
  – esophagectomy
  – esophagoplasty
  – esophagostomy
  – fundoplication
  – gastrectomy
  – gastroenterostomy
  – gastric bypass
  – gastroplasty
  – gastrostomy
  – hepatectomy
  – jejunoileal bypass
  – liver transplantation
  – pancreas transplantation
  – pancreatectomy
  – pancreaticoduodenectomy
  – pancreaticojejunostomy
  – peritoneovenous shunt

– dissection
  – microdissection

– drainage
  – suction

– electrosurgery

– endocrine surgical procedures
  – adrenalectomy
  – castration
  – orchiectomy
  – ovariectomy
  – hypophysectomy
  – hypophysectomy, chemical
  – islets of langerhans transplantation
  – parathyroidectomy
  – thyroidectomy

– extracorporeal circulation
  – cardiopulmonary bypass
  – chemotherapy, cancer, regional perfusion
  – extracorporeal membrane oxygenation
  – heart bypass, left
  – hemofiltration
  – hemodiafiltration
  – hemoperfusion
  – photopheresis
  – ultrafiltration
  – hemofiltration
  – hemodiafiltration

– hemostasis, surgical

– intraoperative care

– intraoperative period

– laparotomy

– laser surgery
  – angioplasty, laser
  – angioplasty, balloon, laser-assisted
  – keratectomy, laser
  – keratectomy, photorefractive, excimer laser
  – keratomileusis, laser in situ
  – keratectomy, subepithelial, laser-assisted
  – laser coagulation

– ligation

– lymph node excision
  – neck dissection
  – sentinel lymph node biopsy

– mastectomy
  – mastectomy, radical
  – mastectomy, extended radical
  – mastectomy, modified radical
  – mastectomy, segmental
  – mastectomy, simple
  – mastectomy, subcutaneous

– microsurgery
  – cerebral revascularization
  – mohs surgery

– monitoring, intraoperative

– obstetric surgical procedures
  – abortion, induced
  – abortion, eugenic
  – abortion, legal
  – abortion, therapeutic
  – pregnancy reduction, multifetal
  – pregnancy reduction, multifetal
  – cerclage, cervical
  – colposcopy
  – colpotomy
  – culdoscopy
  – delivery, obstetric
  – cesarean section
  – cesarean section, repeat
  – episiotomy
  – extraction, obstetrical
  – vacuum extraction, obstetrical
  – home childbirth
  – labor, induced
  – natural childbirth
  – vaginal birth after cesarean
  – version, fetal
  – fetoscopy
  – hysteroscopy
  – hysterotomy

– neurosurgical procedures
  – anterior temporal lobectomy
  – brain tissue transplantation
  – cerebral decortication
  – hemispherectomy
  – cerebrospinal fluid shunts
  – ventriculoperitoneal shunt
  – ventriculostomy
  – craniotomy
  – denervation
  – autonomic denervation
  – parasympathectomy
  – vagotomy
  – vagotomy, proximal gastric
  – vagotomy, truncal
  – sympathectomy
  – ganglionectomy
  – sympathectomy, chemical
  – axotomy
  – cordotomy
  – ganglionectomy
  – muscle denervation
  – nerve block
  – nerve crush
  – rhizotomy
  – vagotomy
  – vagotomy, proximal gastric
  – vagotomy, truncal
  – hypophysectomy
  – laminectomy
  – nerve transfer
  – psychosurgery
  – split-brain procedure
  – stereotaxic techniques
  – neuronavigation
  – radiosurgery
  – trephining

– ophthalmologic surgical procedures
  – blepharoplasty
  – cataract extraction
  – capsulorhexis
  – phacoemulsification
  – corneal transplantation
  – epikeratophakia
  – keratoplasty, penetrating
  – dacryocystorhinostomy
  – eye enucleation
  – eye evisceration
  – filtering surgery
  – sclerostomy
  – trabeculectomy
  – iridectomy
  – keratectomy, photorefractive, excimer laser
  – keratotomy, radial
  – keratomileusis, laser in situ
  – lens implantation, intraocular
  – light coagulation
  – laser coagulation
  – orbit evisceration
  – scleral buckling
  – scleroplasty
  – vitrectomy

– oral surgical procedures
  – apicoectomy
  – gingivectomy
  – gingivoplasty
  – glossectomy
  – jaw fixation techniques
  – mandibular advancement
  – maxillofacial prosthesis implantation
  – mandibular prosthesis implantation
  – oral surgical procedures, preprosthetic
  – alveolar ridge augmentation
  – alveolectomy
  – alveoloplasty
  – dental implantation
  – dental implantation, endosseous
  – blade implantation
  – dental implantation, endosseous, endodontic
  – dental implantation, subperiosteal
  – vestibuloplasty
  – osteotomy, le fort
  – tooth extraction
  – serial extraction
  – tooth replantation

– orthopedic procedures
  – amputation
  – disarticulation
  – hemipelvectomy
  – arthrodesis
  – spinal fusion
  – arthroplasty
  – arthroplasty, replacement
  – arthroplasty, replacement, finger
  – arthroplasty, replacement, hip
  – arthroplasty, replacement, knee
  – arthroscopy
  – bone lengthening
  – ilizarov technique
  – osteogenesis, distraction
  – bone transplantation
  – bone-patellar tendon-bone graft
  – diskectomy
  – diskectomy, percutaneous
  – fracture fixation
  – fracture fixation, internal
  – fracture fixation, intramedullary
  – ilizarov technique
  – limb salvage
  – osteotomy
  – osteotomy, le fort
  – tendon transfer
  – traction

– ostomy
  – cystostomy
  – dacryocystorhinostomy
  – enterostomy
  – cecostomy
  – colostomy
  – duodenostomy
  – ileostomy
  – jejunostomy
  – esophagostomy
  – gastrostomy
  – middle ear ventilation
  – nephrostomy, percutaneous
  – pharyngostomy
  – sclerostomy
  – thoracostomy
  – tracheostomy
  – ureterostomy

– otorhinolaryngologic surgical procedures
  – adenoidectomy
  – laryngectomy
  – laryngoscopy
  – neck dissection
  – otologic surgical procedures
  – auditory brain stem implantation
  – cochlear implantation
  – endolymphatic shunt
  – fenestration, labyrinth
  – middle ear ventilation
  – myringoplasty
  – ossicular replacement
  – stapes surgery
  – stapes mobilization
  – tympanoplasty
  – pharyngectomy
  – pharyngostomy
  – rhinoplasty
  – tonsillectomy
  – tracheostomy
  – tracheotomy

– paracentesis
  – amniocentesis
  – pericardiocentesis

– pelvic exenteration

– perioperative care

– postoperative care

– postoperative period
  – anesthesia recovery period

– preoperative care
  – preanesthetic medication

– prosthesis implantation
  – arthroplasty, replacement
  – arthroplasty, replacement, finger
  – arthroplasty, replacement, hip
  – arthroplasty, replacement, knee
  – auditory brain stem implantation
  – blood vessel prosthesis implantation
  – breast implantation
  – cochlear implantation
  – dental implantation
  – heart valve prosthesis implantation
  – maxillofacial prosthesis implantation
  – mandibular prosthesis implantation
  – ossicular replacement
  – penile implantation

– reconstructive surgical procedures
  – blepharoplasty
  – cervicoplasty
  – chemexfoliation
  – dermabrasion
  – guided tissue regeneration
  – guided tissue regeneration, periodontal
  – limb salvage
  – lipectomy
  – mammaplasty
  – breast implantation
  – rhinoplasty
  – rhytidoplasty
  – scleroplasty
  – tissue expansion

– reoperation

– second-look surgery

– splenectomy

– surgical procedures, elective

– surgical procedures, minimally invasive
  – endoscopy
  – angioscopy
  – arthroscopy
  – bronchoscopy
  – colposcopy
  – culdoscopy
  – cystoscopy
  – endoscopy, digestive system
  – cholangiopancreatography, endoscopic retrograde
  – endoscopy, gastrointestinal
  – colonoscopy
  – sigmoidoscopy
  – duodenoscopy
  – gastroscopy
  – proctoscopy
  – sphincterotomy, endoscopic
  – esophagoscopy
  – fetoscopy
  – hysteroscopy
  – laparoscopy
  – cholecystectomy, laparoscopic
  – laryngoscopy
  – mediastinoscopy
  – neuroendoscopy
  – thoracoscopy
  – thoracic surgery, video-assisted
  – ureteroscopy
  – video-assisted surgery
  – thoracic surgery, video-assisted

– surgical procedures, minor

– suture techniques
  – surgical stapling

– symphysiotomy

– thoracic surgical procedures
  – cardiac surgical procedures
  – cardiomyoplasty
  – heart arrest, induced
  – circulatory arrest, deep hypothermia induced
  – heart bypass, right
  – fontan procedure
  – heart massage
  – heart transplantation
  – heart-lung transplantation
  – heart valve prosthesis implantation
  – myocardial revascularization
  – angioplasty, transluminal, percutaneous coronary
  – atherectomy, coronary
  – coronary artery bypass
  – coronary artery bypass, off-pump
  – internal mammary-coronary artery anastomosis
  – pericardial window techniques
  – pericardiectomy
  – pericardiocentesis
  – mediastinoscopy
  – pulmonary surgical procedures
  – bronchoscopy
  – collapse therapy
  – pneumonolysis
  – pneumothorax, artificial
  – lung transplantation
  – heart-lung transplantation
  – pneumonectomy
  – pneumonolysis
  – thoracoplasty
  – thoracoscopy
  – thoracic surgery, video-assisted
  – thoracostomy
  – thoracotomy
  – thymectomy
  – tracheostomy
  – tracheotomy

– tissue and organ harvesting
  – donor selection

– transplantation
  – cell transplantation
  – islets of langerhans transplantation
  – stem cell transplantation
  – bone marrow transplantation
  – cord blood stem cell transplantation
  – hematopoietic stem cell transplantation
  – mesenchymal stem cell transplantation
  – peripheral blood stem cell transplantation
  – cold ischemia
  – organ transplantation
  – bone transplantation
  – bone-patellar tendon-bone graft
  – heart transplantation
  – heart-lung transplantation
  – kidney transplantation
  – liver transplantation
  – lung transplantation
  – heart-lung transplantation
  – pancreas transplantation
  – replantation
  – tooth replantation
  – tissue transplantation
  – bone marrow transplantation
  – brain tissue transplantation
  – corneal transplantation
  – epikeratophakia
  – keratoplasty, penetrating
  – fetal tissue transplantation
  – liver transplantation
  – skin transplantation
  – transplantation, autologous
  – transplantation, heterologous
  – transplantation, heterotopic
  – transplantation, homologous
  – transplantation, isogeneic
  – warm ischemia

– urogenital surgical procedures
  – castration
  – orchiectomy
  – ovariectomy
  – gynecologic surgical procedures
  – circumcision, female
  – colposcopy
  – colpotomy
  – culdoscopy
  – dilatation and curettage
  – vacuum curettage
  – hysterectomy
  – hysterectomy, vaginal
  – hysteroscopy
  – ovariectomy
  – salpingostomy
  – sterilization, tubal
  – sterilization, reproductive
  – sterilization, involuntary
  – sterilization reversal
  – vasovasostomy
  – sterilization, tubal
  – vasectomy
  – urologic surgical procedures
  – cystectomy
  – kidney transplantation
  – cystoscopy
  – nephrectomy
  – ureteroscopy
  – urinary diversion
  – cystostomy
  – nephrostomy, percutaneous
  – ureterostomy
  – urologic surgical procedures, male
  – circumcision
  – orchiectomy
  – penile implantation
  – prostatectomy
  – transurethral resection of prostate
  – ultrasound, high-intensity focused, transrectal
  – vasectomy
  – vasovasostomy

The list continues at List of MeSH codes (E05).

E04